Ellen Oran Kaden was the chief legal and government affairs officer at Campbell Soup Company. She joined the company in 1998, after having served as the chief legal officer of CBS, Inc. Prior to joining CBS, Kaden practiced law at Cravath, Swaine & Moore and was a member of the Faculty of Law at Columbia University, where she taught contracts, civil procedure, and commercial law.

Kaden has a B.A. from Cornell University, an M.A. from the University of Chicago, where she was a Danforth Fellow, and a J.D. from Columbia Law School. She served as a law clerk to Judge Marvin E. Frankel of the United States District Court for the Southern District of New York.

Kaden was general counsel for CBS during the Wigand 60 Minutes scandal, and pressured CBS News to kill the story in fear of tortious interference. She was the inspiration for the character Helen Caperelli, played by Gina Gershon, in the film the Insider

References

External links
Campbell Soup Company - Executive Team – Ellen Oran Kaden

Columbia Law School alumni
Cornell University alumni
Living people
University of Chicago alumni
American lawyers
Cravath, Swaine & Moore people
Columbia Law School faculty
Year of birth missing (living people)